In enzymology, an oxalate—CoA ligase is an enzyme that catalyzes the chemical reaction

ATP + oxalate + CoA  AMP + diphosphate + oxalyl-CoA

The 3 substrates of this enzyme are ATP, oxalate, and coenzyme A (CoA), whereas its 3 products are AMP, diphosphate, and oxalyl-CoA.

This enzyme belongs to the family of ligases, specifically those forming carbon-sulfur bonds as acid-thiol ligases.  The systematic name of this enzyme class is oxalate:CoA ligase (AMP-forming). Other names in common use include oxalyl-CoA synthetase, and oxalyl coenzyme A synthetase.  This enzyme participates in glyoxylate and dicarboxylate metabolism.

Organisms with Oxalate-CoA Ligases include:
Arabidopsis thaliana
Saccharomyces cerevisiae

References

 

EC 6.2.1
Enzymes of unknown structure